Tournedos Rossini is a French steak dish, named after 19th-century composer Gioachino Rossini. Its invention is attributed to either French master chef Marie-Antoine Carême, Adolphe Dugléré, or Savoy Hotel chef Auguste Escoffier. 

The dish comprises a beef tournedos (filet mignon), pan-fried in butter, served on a crouton, and topped with a hot slice of fresh whole foie gras briefly pan-fried at the last minute. The dish is garnished with slices of black truffle and finished with a Madeira demi-glace sauce.

See also
 List of beef dishes

References

External links
 

French cuisine
Beef dishes
Gioachino Rossini